James Quayle may refer to:

 Dan Quayle (James Danforth Quayle, born 1947), 44th Vice President of the United States
 James C. Quayle (1921–2000), American newspaper publisher
 James Quayle (footballer) (1890–1936), English footballer